CMVC may be:

 Castleford Male Voice Choir
 Configuration Management Version Control